Heinz Meier (February 17, 1930 - July 21, 2013) was a German actor and theatre director. He was most famous for his appearances in many sketches of popular German comedian Loriot, where he was one of the most common actors alongside Loriot himself and Evelyn Hamann. He also appeared in his two films Ödipussi and Pappa Ante Portas, but only in minor roles.

Partial filmography

Guernica – Jede Stunde verletzt und die letzte tötet (1965, TV Movie, dir. Peter Lilienthal) as Fanchou
Seraphine oder Die wundersame Geschichte der Tante Flora (1965, TV Movie, dir. Peter Lilienthal) as Daniel
Große Liebe (1966, TV Movie, dir. Johannes Schaaf) as Hartmut Stiehl
Tattoo (1967, dir. Johannes Schaaf) as Siggi
Lebeck (1968, TV Movie, dir. Johannes Schaaf) as Lebeck
Versetzung (1968, TV Movie, dir. ) as Hagen
Die Klasse (1968, TV Movie, dir. Wolfgang Staudte) as Blau, Teacher
 (1968, dir. Wolfgang Staudte) as Lothar Kunze
 (1969, dir. Peter Schamoni, Herbert Vesely) as Uncle
 (1970, TV Mini-Series, dir. Wolfgang Staudte) as Mr. Wellman
The Weavers (1971, TV Movie, dir. ) as Pfeifer
Ein Fall für Herrn Schmidt (1971, TV Movie, dir. Falk Harnack) as Warnke
Eight Hours Don't Make a Day (1972, TV Series, dir. Rainer Werner Fassbinder) as Meier
World on a Wire (1973, TV Movie, dir. Rainer Werner Fassbinder) as Secretary of State von Weinlaub
 (1974, TV Movie, dir. Reinhard Hauff) as Saremba
Auf Biegen oder Brechen (1975, dir. ) as Teschau
Der Lottogewinner (1976, TV Short, dir. Loriot) as Erwin Lindemann
Iron Gustav (1979, TV series, dir. Wolfgang Staudte) as Herr Tümmel
 (1982, dir. Stefan Lukschy, Christian Rateuke) as Friseur
Der Polenweiher (1986, dir. Nico Hofmann) as Polizist
 (1988, dir. René Perraudin) as Prof. Pruefspitz
Ödipussi (1988, dir. Loriot) as Müller
Pappa Ante Portas (1991, dir. Loriot) as Director
Wir Enkelkinder (1992, dir. Bruno Jonas) as Vater Radunski
 (1998, dir. Markus Imboden) as Wirt Willi Burger
Goebbels und Geduldig (2001, dir. Kai Wessel)
 (2009, dir. Leander Haußmann) as Bertram Kubitschek
Rico, Oskar und die Tieferschatten (2014, dir. Neele Leana Vollmar) as Alter Opa (final film role)

References

External links
 

1930 births
2013 deaths
German actors
German theatre directors